"Nothing" is the first single by English rock band A released from their album Hi-Fi Serious. It reached number nine in the UK Singles Chart; to date, A's highest charting single. During the promotion of the single, the band appeared on Top of The Pops and the Pepsi Chart Show.

The promotional video for Nothing was filmed in Cape Town, South Africa, mostly around the Artscape Theatre Centre formerly known as the Nico Malan theatre complex, and features extras dressed in the same clothes as each band member - complete with band member masks - to create the illusion that there are hundreds of duplicates of the band.

"Nothing" is arguably the heaviest A single, marking something of a departure from the band's usual melodic pop punk to nu metal. It is track 1 on the album Hi-Fi Serious. A live version appears on the live album, Rockin' Like Dokken.

Track listing
CD 1
"Nothing" - 3:44
"T-Shirt Money" - 3:28
"Everybody In" - 4:14
"Nothing" (video)

CD 2
"Nothing" - 3:44
"Getting Me Off" - 3:11
"The Distance" - 3:31
"The Distance" (video)

Charts

Weekly charts

Year-end charts

In pop culture

"Nothing" appears as the title music on the PlayStation 2 and Xbox versions of the 2002 Atari/Eden published racing game V-Rally 3. The songs also appears on the "V-Rally 3" website and was featured in the soundtrack of the anime series :Beyblade V-Force. The song will be used for the House Of Pain Wrestling stable Blazing.

References

A (band) songs
2002 singles
Nu metal songs